The 1936 United States presidential election in Florida was held on November 8, 1936. Florida voters chose seven electors, or representatives to the Electoral College, who voted for president and vice president.

Background
Ever since the disfranchisement of blacks at the beginning of the 1890s, Florida had been a one-party state ruled by the Democratic Party. The disfranchisement of blacks and poor whites by poll taxes in 1889 had left the Republican Party – between 1872 and 1888 dependent upon black votes – virtually extinct.

With the single exception of William Howard Taft's win in Calhoun County in 1908 the Democratic Party won every county in Florida in every presidential election from 1892 until 1916. Only twice – and never for more than one term – did any Republican serve in either house of the state legislature between 1896 and 1928. Despite this Democratic dominance and the restrictions on the franchise of the poorer classes due to the poll tax, significant socialist movements were to develop and persist in Tampa and to a lesser extent over other parts of the state, especially against the powerful Ku Klux Klan. There was also a powerful Prohibitionist movements in older North Florida, which saw the Prohibition Party even win the governorship for one term under the notorious anti-Catholic minister Sidney J. Catts.

The 1920, aided by a growing "Presidential Republican" vote in southern Florida from migrants from northern states, saw the GOP increase its vote totals above those from traditional Unionists (which Florida entirely lacked) in Texas, Arkansas, Alabama or Georgia. In 1928, Florida, especially the western Panhandle pineywoods, turned dramatically away from the Democratic Party due to the nomination of Catholic Al Smith, with the result that Herbert Hoover became the first Republican to win a statewide election since the end of Reconstruction. However, the Depression and elimination of anti-Catholicism saw a return to normal overwhelming Democratic dominance in 1932.

In 1932, Florida would elect David Sholtz as governor who was closely allied with President Roosevelt and strongly in favor of the New Deal. He would even fashion himself politically in a manner that was similar to Roosevelt. Roosevelt would face an assassination attempt in Miami's Bayfront Park in February 1933. Roosevelt would visit Florida on March 23, 1936 going to Rollins College in Winter Park to do a ceremony there. The event would attract sizable crowds and it is believed the presidential election occurring in November would be a sizable motivator for his trip. It was estimated that 75,000 to 100,000 people would watch the motorcade that ended up driving for 10 miles and David Sholtz would ride alongside him.

Vote
A number of conservative Southern newspapers – in Florida, the Jacksonville Times-Union – were opposed to Roosevelt and despite the extreme historical hostility towards the GOP, supported Republican nominee Alf Landon in all but name. Nonetheless, a combination of powerful political funding of the Democratic Party from textile and other businesses, and support for FDR's New Deal in the anti-Smith pineywoods, meant that Landon had no hope of making any gains on Herbert Hoover's performance in 1932. Incumbent President Roosevelt won by 170,869 votes or 52.18%, carrying as in 1932 every county in the state.

Roosevelt’s 76.08% is the second-best ever Democratic performance in Florida behind only Grover Cleveland’s 1892 performance and the best ever Democratic performance for a Democrat with a Republican opponent.

Results

Results by county

Notes

References 

1936
Florida
1936 Florida elections